Simone Nagina Forbes (born 20 June 1981) is a Jamaican sportswoman, having represented Jamaica in no less than five sports, including netball, volleyball, basketball, football and softball.

Forbes played netball with Jamaica U21 in 1998, before making her debut with the Jamaica national netball team the following year. She continued with the national team, winning bronze medals at two Netball World Championships (2003 and 2007) and at the 2002 Commonwealth Games; she also won a silver medal at the inaugural 2009 World Netball Series, followed by another bronze in 2010 World Netball Series. Despite taking a short break away from the sport following the World Series, Forbes remained captain of the Sunshine Girls, and was selected as flag bearer for Jamaica at the 2010 Commonwealth Games in Delhi. As of 2010 Forbes is playing domestic netball for Waulgrovians.

In volleyball, she earned a sports scholarship to Mercy College, New York in 2004. In 2005 Forbes made her debut for the Jamaica women's national volleyball team, and graduated from Mercy College the following year.

In 2011, Forbes tested positive for the banned substance Clomiphene – frequently used by athletes taking steroids, but also commonly used in fertility treatments – during an out-of-competition drug test. She was subsequently banned for three months by the Jamaica Anti-Doping Commission from playing netball; the ban was to end after the 2011 Netball World Championships in Singapore.

Awards 
Prime Minister's National Youth Award for Excellence in the Field of Sports - 2005
International Student Athlete of the Year - 2003
GC Foster College Sportswoman of the Year - 2002
Carreras Sports Foundation Special Award for Netball - 2002

References

External links 
 2009 World Sevens roster, with biographical information on Simone Forbes.

Jamaican netball players
Jamaican women's volleyball players
Jamaican women's basketball players
Mercy College (New York) alumni
Jamaican women's footballers
Softball players
Commonwealth Games bronze medallists for Jamaica
Netball players at the 2002 Commonwealth Games
Netball players at the 2006 Commonwealth Games
Netball players at the 2010 Commonwealth Games
1981 births
Living people
Jamaican sportspeople in doping cases
Commonwealth Games medallists in netball
Women's association footballers not categorized by position
2003 World Netball Championships players
2007 World Netball Championships players
20th-century Jamaican women
21st-century Jamaican women
Medallists at the 2002 Commonwealth Games